Muhammad ibn Ali al-Armani was the son of the Abbasid military commander Ali al-Armani ("Ali the Armenian"), celebrated for leading several campaigns against the Byzantine Empire during his tenure as governor of Tarsus, from ca. 852/3 to 862. Muhammad himself was appointed to the same post in 872, after the nominated governor Muhammad ibn Harun al-Taghlibi died before taking up the post, and held it until he was killed by the Byzantines in 873.

References

Sources
 

873 deaths
Abbasid people of the Arab–Byzantine wars
Abbasid governors of Tarsus
Ethnic Armenian Muslims
Year of birth unknown
Medieval Arabs killed in battle
9th-century Armenian people